Wayne Hamilton Black (born 17 November 1973) is a former professional tennis player from Zimbabwe. The son of former player Don Black, Black turned professional in 1994 and reached his highest singles ranking of 69 on 30 March 1998. He is the younger brother of fellow ATP Tour player Byron Black, with the pair forming the mainstay of the Zimbabwe Davis Cup team for over a decade.  

Black struggled for consistency in his singles game and by the new millenium had converted to a doubles specialist, in which he experienced greater success. He won two men's doubles Grand Slam titles at the 2001 U.S. Open and 2005 Australian Open with compatriot Kevin Ullyett, as well as two Grand Slam mixed doubles titles at the 2002 French Open and 2004 Wimbledon with sister Cara Black.

He reached his career-high doubles ranking of 4 on 31 January 2005, following his second Grand Slam title win, and retired from professional play in 2005.

Early life and education
Black and his siblings Byron and Cara were drilled in tennis from a young age by their father; they frequently played at least an hour of tennis before the school day began, another hour after school, followed by a third hour once homework had been completed. 

He was educated at St. John's College in Harare and the University of Southern California, but left before completing his degree to go professional.

Personal
Black married Kazakhstani tennis player Irina Selyutina and settled in the United Kingdom following retirement, where both of his children were born. He competed in club tennis for Sutton Tennis & Squash Club for a period of time alongside his former coach Miles Maclagan. Citing a failure to get used to the colder climate of London, he later moved back to his home country and ran a tourist lodge with his wife.

Career finals

Doubles (18 titles, 15 runner-ups)

Doubles performance timeline

References

External links
 
 
 

1973 births
Living people
Zimbabwean male tennis players
Sportspeople from Harare
Olympic tennis players of Zimbabwe
Australian Open (tennis) champions
Wimbledon champions
French Open champions
US Open (tennis) champions
Tennis players at the 1996 Summer Olympics
Tennis players at the 2000 Summer Olympics
Tennis players at the 2004 Summer Olympics
Zimbabwean people of English descent
Zimbabwean people of Scottish descent
USC Trojans men's tennis players
White Zimbabwean sportspeople
Hopman Cup competitors
Grand Slam (tennis) champions in mixed doubles
Grand Slam (tennis) champions in men's doubles